Goan Catholic Cuisine is the cuisine of the Goan Catholic community and is largely influenced by the Saraswat, Konkani, Portuguese, South Indian, and British cuisines. Due to over 450 years of Portuguese rule, the cuisine of Goan Catholics is dominated by ingredients and techniques of Portuguese cuisine like deep-frying, oven-baking, pork, vinegar, egg-based desserts, alcohol, etc.

Non-vegetarian

Goan Catholic cuisine has distinct Portuguese influence as can be seen in the Assado de Porco, a famous pork roast crackling dish served as the centrepiece at wedding dinners, the Sarapatel and Cabidela (a dish where fresh pig's blood is stirred into the pork delicacy). The curries use a lot of spices and vinegar. Xit Kodi (Xit – parboiled or red rice; Kodi – fish curry) forms the staple food of the community. Other popular Portuguese influenced delicacies are Chouriço (pork sausage), Vindalho, Peixe Recheado, and Xacuti. 
 
The Chamuça is a Goan derivative of the samosa, which is usually filled with minced beef or minced pork, and is a well-known snack. Beef croquettes and prawn rissoles are common snacks. Sliced roast beef and beef tongue are popular entrees at Goan celebrations. The traditional, Molho de Peixe (fish pickle) and Balchão (prawn pickle), are originally from Macau.

Vegetarian and Sweets

Patoleo (sweet rice cakes steamed in turmeric leaves consisting of a filling of coconut and palm jaggery) are prepared on the Feasts of the Assumption of the Blessed Virgin Mary on 15 August , Saõ João (Nativity of Saint John the Baptist) on 24 June and Konsachem fest (harvest festival) which occurs across Goa during the month of August.

Pez (a type of congee), Koiloris and Podecho (pancakes) are popular delicacies. The Sanna is another popular delicacy made from soaked rice and coconut toddy.

Kadio bodio (tiny sticks made with wheat flour, dipped in sugar syrup or jaggery and dried) are a bestseller at fairs. Revdyo, Tizan, Godshem, Filhoses (a stuffed pancake) and Arroz doce (a Portuguese rice pudding containing eggs) are also popular. Neureos are deep-fried turnovers stuffed with dried coconut, nuts, raisins, and sugar. Kulkul is a curly concoction of deep-fried egg-enriched sweet wheat dough. Bolinhas are small coconut cakes. Perada is a guava-based candy. Batica is a moist, rich coconut cake. Maçapão is cashewnut marzipan formed into the shape of fruits and vegetables. Dôce de grão is a sweet made using chickpeas and coconut. Bebinca is a rich egg-based multi-layered sweet dish, for which Goa is famous.

See also
 Goan cuisine

Citations

References

External links
 Goan Recipes

Goan cuisine
 
Catholic cuisine